Coccobotrys  may refer to:
 Coccobotrys (alga) ,  a genus of algae in the family Chaetophoraceae
 Coccobotrys (fungus) , a genus of fungi in the family Agaricaceae